St. John Cemetery is a Catholic cemetery located in Prairie Township, Union County, South Dakota.  The cemetery is one of four adjacent cemeteries, which are a mile south and a mile east of Beresford, South Dakota.  Of these four, St. John is the cemetery which is farthest west.  The earliest known burial is that of a child named Felix Phillip Mangan in 1886.  As of 2001, the remains of more than 700 individuals were interred at St. John Cemetery.

Notable people buried in St. John Cemetery
 William J. Bulow, South Dakota Governor and United States Senator.
 James and Frances (Kukar) Lass, parents of Donna Lass (possible victim of the Zodiac Killer).
 John W. Maher, member of the South Dakota House of Representatives.

External links
 St. John Cemetery records at Find A Grave
 St. John Cemetery records at Interment
 1940 W.P.A. burial records for St. John Cemetery
 

Cemeteries in South Dakota
Roman Catholic cemeteries in the United States
Protected areas of Union County, South Dakota